Manjumala  is a village in Idukki district in the Indian state of Kerala.

Demographics
 India census, Manjumala had a population of 22629 with 11383 males and 11246 females.

References

Villages in Idukki district